United States gubernatorial elections were held in the fall of 1979, in three states and one territory.

Republicans gained one gubernatorial seat in this year with Dave Treen's victory in Louisiana, who as a result became the first Republican Governor of that state since Reconstruction. Treen led a field of six major candidates in the October 27 primary, and narrowly edged state senator Louis Lambert in the December 8 general election (or "runoff").

Democrats held control of the governor's mansions in Kentucky and Mississippi in the November 6 general elections.

Election results
A bolded state name features an article about the specific election.

Notes

References